Sir Randal Beresford, 2nd Baronet (died 19 October 1681) was an Irish politician and baronet.

Early life
He was the son of Sir Tristram Beresford, 1st Baronet and his first wife Anne Rowley, daughter of John Rowley of Castleroe, County Londonderry, the first Mayor of Derry, and Mary Gage. His paternal grandparents were Tristram Beresford, who was from Kent before settling in Ireland, and his wife Susannah Brooke.

Career
Beresford entered the Irish House of Commons in 1661, sitting for Coleraine until 1668. He served with Stephen Cuppage, who died and was replaced by William Jackson in 1666. Five years later, he succeeded his father as baronet.

Personal life
On 20 February 1662, he married Catherine Annesley, daughter of Francis Annesley, 1st Viscount Valentia  and his second wife Jane Stanhope, and had by her three sons and two daughters, including: 

 Sir Tristram Beresford, 3rd Baronet (1669–1701), who married Hon. Nichola Sophia Hamilton, youngest daughter of Hugh Hamilton, 1st Viscount of Glenawly, in 1687. 
 Catherine Beresford, who married Matthew Pennefather, MP for Cashel, son of Matthew Pennefather, in 1697.
 Jane Beresford (d. 1716), who married Lt.-Gen. Frederick Hamilton, son of Archibald Hamilton (himself a son of Robert Hamilton, 7th of Fairholm and of Milburne).

Beresford died in 1681 and was buried at St Martin-in-the-Fields in London. He was succeeded in the baronetcy by his oldest surviving son Tristram.

Descendants
Through his daughter Catherine, he was a grandfather of Elizabeth Pennefather (–1736/7), who married Alexander MacDonnell, 5th Earl of Antrim.

References

1681 deaths
Baronets in the Baronetage of Ireland
Members of the Parliament of Ireland (pre-1801) for County Londonderry constituencies
People from County Londonderry
Randal
Year of birth unknown
Irish MPs 1661–1666